Teegarden is an unincorporated community in Polk Township, Marshall County, Indiana.

History
Teegarden was platted in 1873. Teegarden has the last name of a family of settlers.

Geography

References

Unincorporated communities in Marshall County, Indiana
Unincorporated communities in Indiana